Eva Calvo may refer to:

 Eva Calvo (taekwondo) (born 1991), Spanish taekwondo practitioner
 Eva Calvo (actress) (died 2001), Mexican actress